Alessandro D'Ancona (20 February 18359 November 1914) was an Italian critic and writer.

Life
He was born at Pisa, of a wealthy Jewish family, and educated in Florence; at the age of eighteen he published his essay on the life and work of the philosopher Tommaso Campanella.

In 1855 Ancona went to Turin, nominally to study law, but in reality to act as intermediary between the Tuscan Liberals and Cavour; he was an intimate friend of Luigi Carlo Farini and represented Tuscany in the Società Nazionale. On the fall of the Austrian dynasty in Tuscany (27 April 1859), he returned to Florence, where he edited the newly founded newspaper La Nazione. In 1861 he was appointed professor of Italian literature at the University of Pisa.

Among his works the following may be mentioned: Opera di Tommaso Campanella, 2 vols. (Turin, 1854); Sacre Rappresentazioni dei secoli XIV., XV., e XVI. (3 vols., Florence, 1872); Origini del Teatro in Italia (2 vols., Florence, 1877); La Poesia popolare italiana (Livorno, 1878), besides several volumes of literary essays, editions of the works of Dante and other early Italian writers, etc.

References

Italian male writers
Italian journalists
Italian male journalists
1835 births
1914 deaths
Mayors of Pisa
19th-century Italian Jews
Academic staff of the University of Pisa
Jewish Italian writers